The Yugoslavia men's national field hockey team represented Yugoslavia in men's international field hockey competitions.

The team participated in one European Championship when it finished in 13th place at the 1974 edition.

Tournament record

European Championship
1974 – 13th place

See also
Croatia men's national field hockey team
Slovenia men's national field hockey team

References

Field hockey
Former national field hockey teams
National team
European men's national field hockey teams